A boombox is a portable stereo.

Boombox or Boom Box may also refer to:

Bands
 BoomBox (American band)
 BoomBox (Ukrainian band)

Recordings
 Boom Box (No Doubt album), a 2003 box set by No Doubt
 Boombox (Kylie Minogue album), a 2009 remix album by Kylie Minogue
 Boombox (Robin album), a 2013 remix album by Robin
 Boombox – Early Independent Hip Hop, Electro and Disco Rap 1979–82, a 2016 compilation album from Soul Jazz Records
 "Boombox" (song), 2016 song by Laura Marano
 "Boombox" (song), a 1985 song by Vitabeats
 Boombox, a 2011 album by Beatsteaks
 "Boombox", a 2010 song by The Lonely Island from Incredibad

Other uses
 Boombox (Sirius), a breakbeat and rock remix Sirius Satellite Radio station
 The Boombox, a website owned by Townsquare Media

See also 
 Boom Blox, a 2008 video game